Barry Johnson is a former professional rugby league footballer who played in the 1970s and 1980s.

Playing career

Challenge Cup Final appearances
Barry Johnson played right-, i.e. number 10, in Castleford's 15-14 victory over Hull Kingston Rovers in the 1986 Challenge Cup Final during the 1985–86 season at Wembley Stadium, London on Saturday 3 May 1986.

County Cup Final appearances
Johnson played right-, i.e. number 10, and won the White Rose Trophy as Man of the match, in Castleford's 10-5 victory over Bradford Northern in the 1981 Yorkshire County Cup Final during the 1981–82 season at Headingley Rugby Stadium, Leeds on Saturday 3 October 1981, played right-, i.e. number 10, in the 18-22 defeat by Hull Kingston Rovers in the 1985 Yorkshire County Cup Final during the 1985–86 season at Headingley Rugby Stadium, Leeds on Sunday 27 October 1985, and played right-, i.e. number 10, in the 31-24 victory over Hull F.C. in the 1986 Yorkshire County Cup Final during the 1986–87 season at Headingley Rugby Stadium, Leeds on Saturday 11 October 1986.

Retirement

References

External links

 Silk Cut Challenge Cup Final - Castleford v Hull Kingston Rovers
Down Memory Lane with Barry Johnson

Living people
Castleford Tigers players
English rugby league players
Place of birth unknown
Rugby league props
Year of birth missing (living people)